This is a list of the National Register of Historic Places listings in Nueces County, Texas.

This is intended to be a complete list of properties and districts listed on the National Register of Historic Places in Nueces County, Texas. There are one district and 17 individual properties listed on the National Register in the county. The district and one individual property are National Historic Landmarks while nine other properties are Recorded Texas Historic Landmarks including one that is also a State Antiquities Landmark.

Current listings

The locations of National Register properties and districts may be seen in a mapping service provided.

|}

See also

National Register of Historic Places listings in Texas
List of National Historic Landmarks in Texas
Recorded Texas Historic Landmarks in Nueces County

References

External links

Registered Historic Places
Nueces County
Buildings and structures in Nueces County, Texas